Carriage driving is a form of competitive horse driving in harness in which larger two or four wheeled carriages (sometimes restored antiques) are pulled by a single horse, a pair, tandem or a four-in-hand team. Prince Philip, Duke of Edinburgh helped to expand the sport. He started to compete in carriage driving in 1971, and the early rule book was drafted under his supervision.

In competitions, the driver and horse(s) have to complete three tests: Dressage, Marathon, and Obstacle Driving. The International Federation for Equestrian Sports (FEI) oversees International Shows. The FEI Driving rules are followed in these competitions, which aim to protect the welfare of the horse and also ensure fairness in competitions.

Pleasure competitions also have classes which are judged on the turnout, neatness or suitability of the horse(s) and carriage.

See also
 Chariot racing

References

External links

 serious competition
 competition

Horse driving
Horse showing and exhibition